Ballynahinch or Ballinahinch is a village in County Galway in the west of Ireland. It is situated close to Recess, on the road from Recess to Roundstone. It also lies on the route of the former railway line from Galway city to Clifden (the "Capital of Connemara"). The name comes from the Irish Baile na hInse meaning settlement of the island.

Ballynahinch Castle, built in 1684 for the Martyn family, is located there.  In the early 1900s it was the summer residence of Ranjitsinhji, the Maharaja of Nawanagar, and former test cricketer  with the English  Cricket Team.

Transport
 railway station opened on 1 November 1895, and was closed on 29 April 1935.

See also
 List of towns and villages in Ireland

References

Towns and villages in County Galway